Maudihan is a village in the Buxar District of Bihar state, India. It is 25 km Far of Bihiya Railway Station and 42 km from Arrah Railway Station. It is located on Arrah- Mohania Road (NH 30).

Transportation 
From main road (NH 30) this village is connected through Maudiha Road.

Railway connectivity for this village is at Bihiya( very nearest almost 25 km far in east), Ara Railway Station (42 km far in east), Dumraon Railway Station (almost 43.4 km far in West to north) .

Demographics
The net population is 1,419, out of which there are 695 males (49%) and 724 females (51%).

Education 
There is a primary school and a madrasa in the village. The Indian government has also introduced various Anganwadi Kendra to provide basic education for villagers.

See also
 List of villages in Buxar district

References

External links
Villages in Buxar, Bihar 

Villages in Buxar district